Krisztina Sereny (born August 6, 1986) is a professional fitness competitor from Budapest, Hungary, but she lives in Spain since 2007. Krisztina has appeared in various fitness magazines such as Robert Kennedy's Oxygen magazine. FLEX magazine, Monde du muscle magazine, CKM, FHM magazine etc. In 2003, she became the first IFBB pro to make the cover of Playboy worldwide.

Contest history
1998 IFBB Hungarian Championship - 4th
1998 NABBA Hungarian Championship - 2nd
1998 IFBB Hungarian Cup - 1st
1999 IFBB Hungarian Championship - 2nd
1999 IFBB Austrian International Championship - 1st
1999 IFBB Burizer Cup 1st
2000 IFBB Slovakian International Championship - 3rd
2000 IFBB HPLBF. Burizer Cup - 3rd
2001 IFBB Pro Fitness European Cup - 8th
2003 WABBA European Championship - 6th
2003 WABBA World Championship - 7th
2004 WABBA European Championship - 1st
2006 NAC world championship 3rd 
2006 WABBA world championship 3rd
2007 NAC World Championship - 1st

References

External links
 Krisztina Sereny - YouTube

Living people
Fitness and figure competitors
Hungarian bodybuilders
1986 births